

See also 
 List of next general elections

References

 
Most recent elections